Zain-ud-Din Ali Khan (died 6 August 1821), better known as Ali Jah was the Nawab of Bengal and Bihar. He succeeded his father, Baber Ali Khan after his death on 28 April 1810. He was succeeded by his half-brother, Ahmad Ali Khan, after his death.

Life

Early years
Zain-ud-Din, was the eldest son of Baber Ali Khan by his wife, Babbu Begum. His coronation was on 5 June 1810

Death and succession
He died on 6 August 1821, leaving only three daughters but no son. He was succeeded by his half-brother, Ahmad Ali Khan.

Marriage

Principal wives

Mut‘ah wives

Children
 H.H. Nawab Khurshid Mahal Umdat-un-nisa Begum Sahiba, born at Mubarak Mahal, Murshidabad in 1810, the daughter of  Azim-un-nisa Khanum. She married Nawab Nazim Humayun Jah, her first cousin and the only son of her uncle, Ahmad Ali Khan and Najib-un-nisa Begum Sahiba on 22 February 1826 
 Sahibzadi Husaini Begum daughter of  Bibi Lutf-un-nisa
 Sahibzadi Wazir-un-nisa Begum daughter of Bibi Zinat-un-nisa

References

External links
   Site dedicated to Nawab Nazim Ali Jah

1821 deaths
Nawabs of Bengal
Year of birth missing